Hösbach is a river of Bavaria, Germany, at the market community Hösbach in the Aschaffenburg district in the Regierungsbezirk of Lower Franconia (Unterfranken).

It is about 5 km (3 mi) long and a right tributary of the Aschaff.

See also
List of rivers of Bavaria

Rivers of Bavaria
Rivers of the Spessart
Rivers of Germany